In Sethian Gnosticism, a luminary is an angel-like being (or heavenly dwelling place in the Apocryphon of John). Four luminaries are typically listed in Sethian Gnostic texts, such as the Secret Book of John, the Holy Book of the Great Invisible Spirit, and Zostrianos. The luminaries are considered to be emanations of the supreme divine triad consisting of the Father (Invisible Spirit), the Mother (Barbelo), and the Child (Autogenes). Listed from highest to lowest hierarchical order, they are:

Harmozel (or Armozel)
Oroiael
Daveithe (or Daveithai)
Eleleth

Eleleth 
Eleleth is a luminary in Gnostic cosmology and one of the four Sethian luminaries. Eleleth appears in Hypostasis of the Archons, Apocryphon of John,  and The Three Forms of the First Thought found in the Nag Hammadi library in 1945 and is probably mentioned in the Gospel of Judas as El.

In The Hypostasis of the Archons, Eleleth comes down from the pleroma to save Norea after she cried out to the Monad for help against the Archons, who try to seize her. After Eleleth appeared, the Archons withdraw from Norea, and Eleleth informs Norea about her true origin and the origin of the world.

See also
Angels in Judaism
Hierarchy of angels
List of angels in theology
Uthra in Mandaeism
Shkinta in Mandaeism
Shekhinah

References

Gnosticism
Individual angels